The Hășmaș is a left tributary of the river Beliu in Romania. It flows into the Beliu near the village Hășmaș.

References

Rivers of Romania
Rivers of Arad County